David Ray Wilkerson (May 19, 1931 – April 27, 2011) was an American Christian evangelist, best known for his book The Cross and the Switchblade. He was the founder of the addiction recovery program Teen Challenge, and founding pastor of the interdenominational Times Square Church in New York City.

Wilkerson's widely distributed sermons, such as "A Call to Anguish", are known for being direct and frank against apostasy and serious about making the commitment to obey Jesus' teachings. He emphasized such Christian beliefs as God's holiness and righteousness, God's love toward humans and especially Christian views of Jesus. Wilkerson tried to avoid categorizing Christians into distinct groups according to the denomination to which they belong.

Early years
David Wilkerson was born in 1931 in Indiana. He was the second son of a family of Pentecostal Christian preachers, and he was raised in Barnesboro, Pennsylvania, in a house "full of Bibles". His paternal grandfather and his father, Kenneth, were ministers. According to Wilkerson's own testimony, he was baptized with the Holy Spirit at the age of eight.

The young Wilkerson began to preach when he was about fourteen. After high school, he entered the Central Bible College in Springfield, Missouri. The school was affiliated with the Assemblies of God. In 1952, he was ordained as a minister.

Ministry
Wilkerson married Gwendolyn Rose "Gwen" Carosso in 1953. He served as a pastor in small churches in Scottdale and Philipsburg in Pennsylvania, until he saw a photograph in Life Magazine in early 1958 of seven teenagers who were members of gangs in New York known as "Egyptian Kings" and the "Dragons" which had merged into a single gang called the "Egyptian Dragons". He later wrote that he felt the Holy Spirit move him with compassion and was drawn to go to New York, in order to preach to them. On his arrival, Wilkerson went to the court in which teenagers were being prosecuted. He entered the room and asked the judge for permission to tell them something, but the judge ejected him. Upon leaving, someone took a photo of Wilkerson, who then became known as the Bible preacher "who had interrupted the gang trial". Soon after this, he began a street ministry to young drug addicts and gang members, which he continued into the 1960s. He founded Teen Challenge in 1958, an evangelical Christian addiction recovery program  in Brooklyn affiliated with the Assemblies of God, with a network of Christian social and evangelizing work centers.

Wilkerson gained national recognition after he co-authored the book The Cross and the Switchblade in 1962 with John and Elizabeth Sherrill about his street ministry. The book became a best-seller, with over 50 million copies in over thirty languages, and is included in Christianity Today'''s "Top 50 Books That Have Shaped Evangelicals". In the book, Wilkerson tells of the conversion of gang member Nicky Cruz, who later became an evangelist himself and wrote the autobiographical Run Baby Run. Nicky had been the leader of the "Mau Maus" gang, and he and his friend Israel Narvaez became Christians after hearing Wilkerson preach. The 1970 film The Cross and the Switchblade, starring Pat Boone as Wilkerson and Erik Estrada as Cruz, was adapted from the book of the same name.

In 1967, Wilkerson began Youth Crusades, an evangelistic ministry aimed at teenagers whom Wilkerson called "goodniks"—middle-class youth who were restless and bored. His goal was to prevent them from becoming heavily involved with drugs, alcohol, or violence. Through this ministry, the CURE Corps (Collegiate Urban Renewal Effort) was founded. In 1971, Wilkerson moved his ministry headquarters to Lindale, Texas. On September 22 he founded World Challenge, an organization seeking to promote and spread the Gospel throughout the world.

Wilkerson noted that in 1986, while walking down 42nd Street in New York City at midnight, the Holy Spirit called him to return to New York City and to raise up a ministry in Times Square. He founded and became the pastor of Times Square Church, which opened its doors in October 1987. The church first occupied rented auditoriums in Times Square (Town Hall and the Nederlander Theater), before moving to the historic Mark Hellinger Theatre in 1989, in which it has operated ever since.

Wilkerson did not preach in the name of any specific denomination. Instead, he focused on biblical preaching with the aim of encouraging people to seek God through a personal and deeper knowledge of Jesus Christ and the experience of the Holy Spirit. He said:

Throughout his ministry, Wilkerson had contact with many other prominent Christian ministers, including Leonard Ravenhill, who was his friend, and Ray Comfort, whom Wilkerson met in 1992 after listening to a message called Hell's Best Kept Secret.

From the 1990s, Wilkerson focused his efforts on encouraging pastors and their families throughout the world to "renew their passion for Christ".

Wilkerson and his wife Gwen moved to New York City at the inception of Times Square Church in 1987, and in 2006 began splitting their time between New York and Texas. They had four children and eleven grandchildren.

Visions
Wilkerson claimed to receive a vision in 1973 regarding the future of the United States, subsequently published in a book called The Vision. Some of the subject areas of this prophecy were: "Worldwide recession caused by economic confusion"; "Nature having labor pains"; "A flood of filth and a baptism of dirt in America"; "Rebellion in the home"; and "A persecution madness against truly Spirit filled Christians who love Jesus Christ".

On March 7, 2009 Wilkerson posted a message to his personal blog titled 'An Urgent Message' in which he re-stated an earlier prophecy he had made concerning New York City: "For ten years I have been warning about a thousand fires coming to New York City. It will engulf the whole megaplex, including areas of New Jersey and Connecticut. Major cities all across America will experience riots and blazing fires". Wilkerson indicated that this would be part of an "earth-shattering calamity" affecting the whole earth, brought on by the wrath of God in judgement against "the raging sins of America and the nations". Regarding the timing of these events, he said: "I do not know when these things will come to pass, but I know it is not far off."

Death
On the afternoon of April 27, 2011, Wilkerson died when he collided head-on with an 18-wheeler in East Texas. He was pronounced dead at the scene, less than a month from his 80th birthday.  His wife Gwendolyn was seriously injured. Gwendolyn Wilkerson died a year later, on July 5, 2012 from cancer, at the age of 81.

BibliographyEnd Times New Testament Jesus Person Maturity ManualMy Bible Speaks to MePromises To Live By, Twelve Angels from Hell (1965), Born Old (1966) original title The Little People, I'm Not Mad at God (1967), Parents on Trial (1967)Hey, Preach . . . You're Comin' Through! (1968) I've Given Up On Parents (1969), Man, Have I Got Problems (1969) Purple Violet Squish (1969), Rebel's Bible (1970), Get Your Hands Off My Throat (1971), The Untapped Generation (with Don Wilkerson) (1971), What Every Teenager Should Know About Drugs (1971), Jesus Person Pocket Promise Book (1972)The Jesus walk: Selected "why's" and "how-to's" for a closer walk with Christ (A Regal Jesus Person Maturity book) (1972), Life on the Edge of Time (1972) One Way To Where? (1972), Pocket Promise Book (1972), This Is Loving? (1972), When In Doubt, Faith It! (1972), David Wilkerson Speaks Out (1973), Jesus Christ Solid Rock: The Return Of Christ (with Kathryn Kuhlman, Hal Lindsey and W. A. Criswell) (1973)The Vision (1973), .Beyond The Cross and the Switchblade (1974), Racing Toward Judgment (1976), Suicide (1978), Victory Over Sin and Self (1980) Originally titled Two of Me, Rock Bottom (pamphlet) (1981)Pocket Proverbs (1983), Set the Trumpet to thy Mouth (1985), David Wilkerson Exhorts the Church'' (1991)

References

External links

Web Page on Egyptian Kings Gang
Photos of the Car accident
David Wilkerson: Pentecostal Evangelist, Prophet, and Pastor

1931 births
2011 deaths
20th-century American male writers
20th-century apocalypticists
20th-century evangelicals
21st-century American male writers
21st-century apocalypticists
21st-century evangelicals
American evangelists
American Pentecostals
American religious leaders
Arminian ministers
Arminian writers
Central Bible College alumni
Evangelical writers
People from Hammond, Indiana
Prophets in Christianity
Road incident deaths in Texas
Street ministry
Writers from Indiana
Writers from New York City
Writers from Texas